Traditional knowledge geographic information systems (GIS) are the data, techniques, and technologies designed to document and utilize local knowledges in communities around the world.  Traditional knowledge is information that encompasses the experiences of a particular culture or society.  Traditional knowledge GIS differ in comparison to ordinary cognitive maps in that they express environmental and spiritual relationships among real and conceptual entities. This toolset focuses on cultural preservation, land rights disputes, natural resource management, and economic development.

Technical aspects

Traditional knowledge GIS employs cartographic and database management techniques such as participatory GIS, map biographies, and historical mapping. Participatory GIS aspires to a mutually beneficial relationship between the governing and the governed by fostering public involvement in all aspects of a GIS.  It is widely accepted that this technique is necessary to sound environmental and economic planning in developing areas.  This method generates a sense of place in scientific analysis that incorporates sacred sites and traditional land use practices.  Participatory GIS can be effective for local resource management and planning, but researchers doubt its efficacy as a tool in attaining land tenure or fighting legal battles because of lack of expertise among local individuals and lack of access to technology.

Map biographies track the practices of local communities either for the sake of preservation or to argue for resource protection or land grants.  GIS technologies are powerful in their ability to accommodate multimedia and multidimensional data sets, which allows for the recording and playing of oral histories and representations of abstract ecological knowledge.

Historical mapping documents and analyzes events that are meaningful to a particular tradition or locale.  Cultural and humanitarian benefits derive from including maps in the historical record of an area.

Cultural preservation

Cultural preservation is perhaps the principal application of a traditional knowledge GIS.  As adherents to traditional lifestyles decline in population, there has developed a degree of urgency surrounding the collection of data and wisdom from aging local elders.  A central feature of cultural preservation is language revitalization.  Bilingual visual and audible maps depict oral traditions and historical information in places of cultural significance at various scales and levels of detail.

Researchers encounter significant obstacles to data acquisition due to the sensitive natures of much of the data sought for a traditional knowledge GIS, and locals may distrust the motives of outside consultants.

Land rights and natural resource management

Traditional knowledge GIS have the power to frame debates over land rights and resource management in ecologically sensitive areas.  Interests of local residents in these regions often conflict with those of migrant workers, state conservation units, and domestic and foreign mining or logging enterprises.  GIS hardware and software are used to identify spatial trends in interpreting these conflicts.

Economic development

Economic development through traditional knowledge GIS is requisite to local ownership over the systems and full access to relevant data and training.  This situation is rare outside of industrialized nations, so little progress has been made in this field of research.

Current issues and effectiveness

There is a disparate nature to implementations of traditional knowledge GIS across geographies.  Though developing nations utilize some forms of participatory GIS, communities there are less likely to gain access to expensive databases and cartographic methods than those in developed nations.

The overall effectiveness of traditional knowledge GIS has not been determined conclusively.  Advocates for traditional mapping point to successes in acquiring land titles, managing local databases, and creating new skill sets for local communities worldwide.  Detractors cite cost, the need for specialized training, and cultural differences as reasons GIS may be inappropriate for these applications.  Traditional knowledge GIS analyze the nature of political and social struggles that lead to competing resource claims.  They are powerful tools for mediation and negotiation among coexisting social groups.

No cost or open source traditional knowledge software 

The Nunaliit Atlas Framework was developed by and is maintained by the Geomatics and Cartographic Research Centre at Carleton University. The focus of this software is to create community Atlas projects.

Commercial software 

The CEDAR tool has a number of modules focused on contact relationship management, consultation for development projects, heritage projects and GIS. This software is provided either as a hosted service or as a computer located in client offices.

The LOUIS toolkit is a suite of tools for recording, managing and using traditional land use and traditional knowledge information. This software is provided as a hosted service with complementary desktop and mobile applications. Complementary to these hosted services is a mobile data collection application.

See also
Participatory 3D modelling (P3DM)
Participatory GIS

References

Applications of geographic information systems
Geographical technology
Geographic information systems
GIS